Naft Chal (also Romanized as Naft Chāl) is a village in Chapakrud Rural District, Gil Khuran District, Juybar County, Mazandaran Province, Iran. At the 2006 census, its population was 150, in 38 families.

References 

Populated places in Juybar County